Rodina is a rural locality (a village) in Leninskoye Rural Settlement, Kudymkarsky District, Perm Krai, Russia. The population was 3 as of 2010.

Geography 
It is located 23 km south from Kudymkar.

References 

Rural localities in Kudymkarsky District